Cytoplasmic protein NCK2 (also known as NCK-beta and Grb4) is a protein that in humans is encoded by the NCK2 gene.

Function 

NCK belongs to family of adaptor proteins. There are two mammalian NCK genes, NCK1 and NCK2. NCK1 is located in chromosome 3 and NCK2 is located in chromosome 2. The protein contains three SH3 domains and one SH2 domain. The protein has no known catalytic function but has been shown to bind and recruit various proteins involved in the regulation of receptor protein tyrosine kinases. It is through these regulatory activities that this protein is believed to be involved in cytoskeletal reorganization. Alternate transcriptional splice variants, encoding different isoforms, have been characterized.

Interactions 

NCK2 has been shown to interact with:

 Epidermal growth factor receptor, 
 LIMS1, 
 PDGFRB, 
 PTK2, 
 T-cell surface glycoprotein CD3 epsilon chain  and
 TrkB.

References

Further reading

External links 
Nck2 Info with links in the Cell Migration Gateway 

Human proteins